Susie Kitchens is a British diplomat who was the Deputy High Commissioner in Kenya/Permanent Representative to the UN Environment Programme (2017-2020) and Consul General in Boston (2012-2016 - succeeded by Harriet Cross). She also spent three years as Deputy High Commissioner in Tanzania.

Kitchens earned an undergraduate degree in Human Sciences from Lady Margaret Hall, Oxford University and an MSc in Public Health from the London School of Hygiene & Tropical Medicine.

References

British consuls
British women diplomats
Alumni of the University of Oxford
Alumni of the London School of Hygiene & Tropical Medicine
Year of birth missing (living people)
Living people